Robert William Armstrong (November 20, 1890 – April 20, 1973) was an American film and television actor remembered for his role as Carl Denham in the 1933 version of King Kong by RKO Pictures. He delivered the film's famous final line: "It wasn't the airplanes. It was beauty killed the beast."

Early years
Born in Saginaw, Michigan, Armstrong lived in Bay City, Michigan until about 1902 and moved to Seattle. He attended the University of Washington, where he studied law, and became a member of Delta Tau Delta International Fraternity.  Armstrong gave up his studies to manage his uncle's touring companies.

Career 

Armstrong first started acting in the stage in 1919 with the production of Boys Will Be Boys.  Armstrong's silver screen career began in 1927 when he appeared in Pathé's silent drama The Main Event. He appeared in 127 films between 1927 and 1964; very prolific in the late 1920s and early 1930s, he made nine movies in 1928 alone. He is best known for his role as director Carl Denham in King Kong. Months later, he starred as Carl Denham again in the sequel, Son of Kong, released the same year. He resembled King Kong producer and adventurer Merian C. Cooper, and Cooper used him in several films as more or less a version of himself. The Most Dangerous Game was filmed at night on the same jungle sets as King Kong, which was shot during the day, with Armstrong and Fay Wray simultaneously starring in both pictures. In 1937, Armstrong starred in With Words and Music (also referred to as The Girl Said No), released by Grand National Films Inc. He also worked throughout the 1930s and 1940s for many film studios. Prior to World War II, in 1940, Universal Pictures released Enemy Agent, about countering a Nazi spy ring. In the film, Armstrong co-starred with Helen Vinson, Richard Cromwell and Jack La Rue. In 1942, he was reteamed with Cromwell in Baby Face Morgan, a notable B movie for PRC (Producers Releasing Corporation). Later in that decade, Armstrong played another Carl Denham-like leading character role as "Max O'Hara" in 1949's Mighty Joe Young. This film was another stop-motion animation giant gorilla fantasy, made by the same King Kong team of Merian C. Cooper and Ernest B. Schoedsack.

In the 1950s, he appeared as Sheriff Andy Anderson on Rod Cameron's syndicated western-themed television series, State Trooper.  Armstrong made four guest appearances on Perry Mason during its nine-year run on CBS: in 1958 he played as Walter Haskell in "The Case of the Sardonic Sergeant"; in 1961 he played the title character and murder victim Captain Bancroft in "The Case of the Malicious Mariner"; in 1962 he played defendant Jimmy West in "The Case of the Playboy Pugilist"; and in 1964 he played murderer Phil Jenks in "The Case of the Accosted Accountant," thus becoming one of only eleven actors to hit the Perry Mason trifecta, playing victim, defendant and murderer.

Marriages
Peggy Allenby (August 1920 - April 17, 1925; divorced) (died 1966) 
Ethel Virah Smith (June 12, 1926 - July 27, 1931; divorced) (died 1950) 
Gladys Dubois (January 10, 1936 - December 31, 1939; divorced) (died 1971)
Claire Louise Frisbie (January 1, 1940 - April 20, 1973; his death) (died 1990)

Death
Armstrong died of cancer in Santa Monica, California. He and King Kong'''s co-producer, Merian C. Cooper, died within sixteen hours of each other.

Filmography The Main Event (1927) as Red LucasThe Leopard Lady (1928) as ChrisA Girl in Every Port (1928) as Bill / SalamiSquare Crooks (1928) as Eddie EllisonThe Cop (1928) as Scarface MarcasThe Baby Cyclone (1928) as GeneCelebrity (1928) as Kid ReaganShow Folks (1928) as Owens - PromoterNed McCobb's Daughter (1928) as Babe CallahanThe Shady Lady (1928) as BlakeThe Leatherneck (1929) as Joseph HanlonThe Woman from Hell (1929) as AlfBig News (1929) as Steve BanksOh, Yeah! (1929) as Dude CowanThe Racketeer (1929) as Mahlon KeaneBe Yourself! (1930) as Jerry MooreDumbbells in Ermine (1930) as Jerry MaloneDanger Lights (1930) as Larry DoyleBig Money (1930) as AcePaid (1930) as Joe GarsonIron Man (1931) as George ReganEx-Bad Boy (1931) as Chester BinneyThe Tip-Off (1931) as Kayo McClureSuicide Fleet (1931) as Dutch Panama Flo (1932) as Babe DillonThe Lost Squadron (1932) as WoodyRadio Patrol (1932) as Bill KennedyIs My Face Red? (1932) as Ed MaloneyThe Most Dangerous Game (1932) as Martin TrowbridgeHold 'Em Jail (1932) as The Radio AnnouncerThe Penguin Pool Murder (1932) as Barry CostelloThe Billion Dollar Scandal (1932) as Fingers PartosKing Kong (1933) as Carl DenhamFast Workers (1933) as Bucker ReillyI Love That Man (1933) as DrillerBlind Adventure (1933) as Richard BruceAbove the Clouds (1933) as Scoop AdamsSon of Kong (1933) as Carl DenhamPalooka (1934) as Pete PalookaSearch for Beauty (1934) as Larry WilliamsShe Made Her Bed (1934) as 'Duke' GordonManhattan Love Song (1934) as Tom WilliamsThe Hell Cat (1934) as Dan CollinsKansas City Princess (1934) as Dynamite 'Dynie' CarsonFlirting with Danger (1934) as Bob OwensThe Mystery Man (1935) as Larry DoyleGigolette (1935) as Chuck AhearnSweet Music (1935) as 'Dopey' MaloneG Men (1935) as Jeffrey "Jeff" McCordLittle Big Shot (1935) as Steve CraigRemember Last Night? (1935) as Flannagan, the Milburns' mechanicDangerous Waters (1936) as 'Dusty' JohnsonThe Ex-Mrs. Bradford (1936) as Nick Martel (bookie)Public Enemy's Wife (1936) as Gene FergusonAll American Chump (1936) as Bill HoganWithout Orders (1936) as Wad. MadisonNobody's Baby (1937) as Scoops HanfordThree Legionnaires (1937) as Sgt. Chuck ConnorsIt Can't Last Forever (1937) as Al TinkerThe Girl Said No (1937) as Jimmie AllenShe Loved a Fireman (1937) as Capt. Smokey ShannonThe Night Hawk (1938) as Charlie McCormickThere Goes My Heart (1938) as Detective O'BrienThe Flying Irishman (1939) as Joe AldenMan of Conquest (1939) as Jim BowieUnmarried (1939) as Pins StreaverWinter Carnival (1939) as Tiger ReynoldsFlight at Midnight (1939) as Jim BrennanThe Roaring Twenties (1939) as Hatted Passerby before Nightclub (uncredited)Call a Messenger (1939) as Kirk GrahamFramed (1940) as SkippyForgotten Girls (1940) as Grover MullinsEnemy Agent (1940) as GordonService with the Colors (1940) as Sgt. ClickerThe Bride Wore Crutches (1940) as PeteBehind the News (1940) as Vic ArcherThe San Francisco Docks (1940) as Father CameronMr. Dynamite (1941) as PaulSky Raiders (1941) as Lieutenant Ed CareyCitadel of Crime (1941) as Cal FullertonDive Bomber (1941) as Art LyonsGang Busters (1942) as Det. Tim NolanMy Favorite Spy (1942) as Harry RobinsonIt Happened in Flatbush (1942) as Danny MitchellLet's Get Tough! (1942) as Pop StevensBaby Face Morgan (1942) as 'Doc' RogersWings Over the Pacific (1943) as Pieter Van BronkAdventures of the Flying Cadets (1943) as Arthur Galt, alias The Black HangmanThe Kansan (1943) as MalachyThe Mad Ghoul (1943) as Ken McClureAround the World (1943) as General (uncredited)Action in Arabia (1944) as Matthew ReedThe Navy Way (1944) as CPO HarperMr. Winkle Goes to War (1944) as Joe TinkerBelle of the Yukon (1944) as GeorgeBlood on the Sun (1945) as Col. Hideki TojoGangs of the Waterfront (1945) as Peter Winkly and Dutch MaloneThe Falcon in San Francisco (1945) as De Forrest MarshallArson Squad (1945) as Fire Capt. Joe DuganThe Royal Mounted Rides Again (1945) as Jonathan PriceGay Blades (1946) as McManusBlonde Alibi (1946) as WilliamsG.I. War Brides (1946) as DawsonDecoy (1946) as Frankie OlinsCriminal Court (1946) as Vic Wright - Club Circle ownerThe Sea of Grass (1947) as Floyd McCurtin (Brewton's attorney)Fall Guy (1947) as Mac McLaineExposed (1947) as Inspector PrenticeThe Fugitive (1947) as A Sergeant of PoliceReturn of the Bad Men (1948) as 'Wild Bill Doolin' / Wild Bill DoolinThe Paleface (1948) as TerriThe Lucky Stiff (1949) as Insp. Von FlanaganThe Crime Doctor's Diary (1949) as George 'Goldie' HarriganStreets of San Francisco (1949) as Willard LoganMighty Joe Young (1949) as Max O'HaraSons of New Mexico (1949) as Pat FeeneyCaptain China (1950) as KeeganDestination Big House (1950) as Ed SomersThe Pace That Thrills (1952) as J.C. BartonLas Vegas Shakedown (1955) as DocDouble Jeopardy (1955) as Sam BaggottThe Peacemaker (1956) as Sheriff Ben SealeThe Crooked Circle (1957) as Al TaylorGirl with an Itch (1958) as Ben CooperJohnny Cool (1963) as Gang MemberFor Those Who Think Young'' (1964) as Norman Armstrong - Cronin's Business Associate (final film role)

Notes

References

External links

Robert Armstrong at Virtual History

1890 births
1973 deaths
American male film actors
People from Saginaw, Michigan
American male silent film actors
American male radio actors
Burials at Westwood Village Memorial Park Cemetery
Male actors from Michigan
Deaths from cancer in California
20th-century American male actors
United States Army officers
United States Army personnel of World War I
RKO Pictures contract players
University of Washington School of Law alumni
Military personnel from Michigan